The American Dream (Don Lee Van Winkle, Nicky Indelicato, Nick Jameson (later of Foghat), Don Ferris, Mickey Brook) were a Philadelphia-based band whose eponymously titled album (1970) was the first ever album produced by Todd Rundgren.

References

Musical groups from Philadelphia